"Lie to Me" is a song by Australian singer songwriter Vera Blue, released on 20 August 2022 via Island Records Australia and Universal Music Australia.

Upon release, Vera Blue explained how the track touches on falling in love after a rough break-up. saying, "When you go through a lot of emotional shit, you can't imagine yourself in a new relationship. Then you suddenly fall into one, and the fear and mistrust can be overwhelming: 'is this as amazing as it seems – or is it going to blow up in my face again?'"

Furthermore, Vera Blue told Triple J the song is about "The beauty of falling in love but also the anxieties and fears of rejection that come with falling in love if you've been through past traumas or had your heart broken. The lyric 'lie to me' isn't necessarily aimed at anyone – it's a conversation with myself. It's the paranoia and little voices in my head."

The music video was directed by Onil Kotian and released on 8 September 2020.

Track listing 
Digital download

Certifications

Credits and personnel
Credits adapted from Spotify.

 Celia Pavey – vocals, writing
 Andy Mak – writing, production
 Thom Mak– writing
 Thom Macken – writing

References

2020 songs
2020 singles
Vera Blue songs
Universal Music Australia singles
Island Records singles
Songs written by Vera Blue